The aspen leaf blotch miner moth (Phyllonorycter apparella) is a moth of the family Gracillariidae. It is found in most of Europe (except the British Isles, the Iberian Peninsula, the Balkan Peninsula, and the Mediterranean islands). It is also present in Turkey and North America.

The wingspan is 8.5–10 mm. There is one generation per year.

The larvae feed on Populus canescens and Populus tremula. They mine the leaves of their host plant. The mine has the form of a lower-surface tentiform mine with one or two strong folds. Each mine has one larva, and each leaf may have up to 26 mines. The frass is clumped in a corner of the mine. Pupation takes place in the mine in a white cocoon.

References

External links
Fauna Europaea
bladmineerders.nl
Phyllonorycter apparella, a new record and a new pest of trembling aspen (Populus tremula) in Turkey
Bug Guide

apparella
Moths of Europe
Moths of Asia
Moths of North America

Moths described in 1855
Leaf miners
Taxa named by Gottlieb August Wilhelm Herrich-Schäffer